Concordia Cemetery may refer to:

Concordia Cemetery (Buffalo, New York)
Concordia Cemetery (El Paso, Texas)